Chungnyungsan is a mountain in Gyeonggi-do, South Korea. Its area extends across the city of Namyangju and the county of Gapyeong.

See also
List of mountains in Korea

Notes

References

Mountains of Gyeonggi Province
Namyangju
Gapyeong County
Mountains of South Korea